Laurence Arné (born 4 February 1982) is a French actress, comedian and writer.

Filmography

Theatre

References

External links

Living people
French film actresses
21st-century French actresses
1982 births
People from Angoulême